Maureen Anne McDonald (born May 13, 1981), better known as Mozella, is an American songwriter and singer. Along with her album releases, Mozella co-wrote the Miley Cyrus Billboard number-one song "Wrecking Ball".
 
Some of Mozella's other co-writes include the songs, "I Believe", "Strangers", "Every Single Time, and "Don't Throw It Away" for the Jonas Brothers' album Happiness Begins (2019), "Drop Top" and "Horses" on Keith Urban's Graffiti U album, Pink’s "Cover Me In Sunshine", Kelly Clarkson's 2017 single "Love So Soft", "One Call Away" by Charlie Puth, "Fool's Gold" and "Perfect" by One Direction, "Bright" by Echosmith, Ellie Goulding's "Don't Panic", "Holding on for Life", and "We Can't Move to This" from Goulding's album Delirium (co-wrote with Goulding and Greg Kurstin), "Feels Like Vegas" with Tinashe, and "Take You High" off Kelly Clarkson's 2015 album, Piece by Piece. Madonna and Mozella co-wrote eleven of the nineteen tracks on the album Rebel Heart, including the single "Living for Love" with Diplo, Ariel Rechtshaid, and Toby Gad.

In the genres of film, television and theater, she co-wrote "A Little Party Never Killed Nobody" with Goonrock and Fergie for Baz Luhrmann's The Great Gatsby. In early 2014 she continued her work with Baz Luhrmann, penning "A Beautiful Surprise" with David Foster for Luhrmann's musical theater adaption of his cult classic film Strictly Ballroom. She also co-wrote  "Dancing in the Dark" by Rihanna for the DreamWorks animated movie Home, in 2015.
 
Mozella's song "Anything is Possible" is used in the 2018 L’Oreal El Vive commercials. Her song "Love Is Endless" was used in the 2015 McDonald's "Archenemies" television campaign. Beginning April 2015, Chase Bank used her song "Can't Get Enough" for their new commercials in the US. Some of the brands that have used Mozella's music in their branding include Chrysler, Verizon, Microsoft, Mercedes-Benz, and JC Penney.

Mozella has released three full-length albums, I Will (Warner/Maverick, 2006), Belle Isle (Universal/Motown, 2009), and The Brian Holland Sessions (Belle Isle Records, 2012), as well as three EPs, Mozella (Warner/Maverick, 2005), The Straits (Universal/Motown, 2009) and The Love (Universal/Motown, 2010).

Early life
Mozella was raised in Detroit, Michigan, where she got her start as a performer booking her own gigs in coffee houses at age 15 Early on, she collaborated with artists such as Warren G, and in 2002, then Mozella was invited to England to write and record with Tim Saul, producer for Portishead. Upon her return to Los Angeles, she signed with Maverick Records to record her first EP and album.

Music career

Warner/Maverick Records
Mozella signed to Madonna’s Maverick Records in July 2003. In 2004, when Maverick was absorbed into Warner Bros. Records Mozella survived the merger. In July 2005, she released her self-titled debut EP on Warner/Maverick Records.  Then, in November 2006, she released her full-length debut, I Will, (produced by Jude Cole) on the same imprint. At the time, allmusic.com called Mozella, "One of the best things to come out of pop music this year."

Universal/Motown Records
Upon signing to Universal/Motown Records in July 2008, Mozella recruited multiple producers and writers for her second album, Belle Isle, including Marty James, Jimmy Harry, Tony Kanal, Sunny Levine, and Smidi. The album was released on October 20, 2009, but prior to that The Straits EP came out July 7, 2009 on this label.

The Brian Holland Sessions on Belle Isle Records
On July 24, 2012, Mozella released The Brian Holland Sessions, which she co-wrote with Motown songwriter Brian Holland of the  trio Holland-Dozier-Holland, who is known for the hits he wrote for The Four Tops, The Isley Brothers, Marvin Gaye, The Supremes and others. "Brian Holland's soul pours out of him in melody everywhere he goes. He is a conduit," she told Rolling Stone about working with the songwriter on her album.

Mozella performed "You Don't Love Anyone But Yourself" from The Brian Holland Sessions on The Tonight Show with Jay Leno on July 26, 2012.

Touring
Following her Warner/Maverick debut in 2006, Mozella toured the U.S. with Tyler Hilton, Dave Matthews Band, Lifehouse, Five for Fighting, Daniel Powter, Michelle Branch, and Colbie Caillat. As she moved away from creating her own album releases, Mozella stopped touring.

Film and TV placement
Mozella's songs have been featured in movies, trailers, and television series' including Fringe, The Closer, The City, Castle, The Hills, Bones, One Tree Hill, The Biggest Loser, American Idol, etc.  Her song "More of You" was prominently featured in the first episode of Pretty Little Liars and on the soundtrack. She's also had two song syncs in Grey's Anatomy in 2011.

She has written and recorded numerous songs for commercials including "Amazed" for Mercedes Benz, "Thank You" and "Let's Stop Calling It Love" for Nivea, "Magic" for Verizon's "iDon't" Motorola Droid campaign. "This is Love" and "Glow" were used in the 2011 and 2013 JC Penney holiday TV advertisements. In 2012, Mozella's cover of "Some Like It Hot" (made famous by Marilyn Monroe) was used for the Carl's Jr./Hardee's "Drive-In" ad, that featured model Kate Upton.REF Later, her songs have been sync'd by Special K,REF Nestle,REF Tesco, McDonald's, Verizon, and more.

Discography
Mozella EP (2005)
I Will (2006)
The Straits EP (2009)
Belle Isle (2009)
The Love EP (2010)
The Brian Holland Sessions (2012)

Songwriting credits

Songs written

References

1981 births
Living people
American women pop singers
American women singer-songwriters
Singers from Detroit
Maverick Records artists
Motown artists
Universal Motown Records artists
Warner Records artists
Singer-songwriters from Michigan
21st-century American women